Thabo Andrew Rametsi II (born 17 July 1988), popularly as Thabo Rametsi, is a South African actor and producer. He is best known for his roles in the popular serials The Giver, The Gamechangers and Kalushi: The Story of Solomon Mahlangu.

Personal life
He was born on 17 July 1988 in Umlazi, KwaZulu-Natal, South Africa. He later moved to Kempton Park and studied at Norkem Park Primary School and later attended to Norkem Park High School. During school times, he developed his skills of acting, and acted in several television commercials and plays. He later graduated with a degree in law at UNISA.

In January 2019, he was allegedly brutalised by a group of Johannesburg's Community Policing Forum (CPF) members.

Career
In 2010, he made acting debut with the SABC1 acting competition series Class Act. Then in 2011, he played the role 'David' in the television series Wild at Heart. In 2012, he made cinema debut with Fanie Fourie's Lobola and played the role 'Motlatsi. He also appeared on television serials such as High Rollers as orphan 'Muzi Khuzwayo' in 2013.

In 2014, he made a guest role in an episode of the popular international television series Homeland. Then he acted in the television movie The Gamechangers and played the role of serial killer 'Devin Moore' alongside renowned international actors Daniel Radcliffe and Bill Paxton. In 2016, he became famous with the feature film Kalushi: The Story of Solomon Mahlangu, which was based on a true story. In the film, he played the lead role 'Solomon Kalushi Mahlangu', who was executed by the apartheid government at the age of 23. In September 2016, he won the Best Actor Award for this role at the inaugural BRICS Film Festival in India.

In 2017, he played the role investigative reporter 'Tebogo Ramolang' in the fourth season of the television series Hard Copy.

Filmography

References

External links
 

Living people
South African male television actors
1979 births
South African male film actors
People from Rustenburg